Huapai is a locality north-west of Auckland, New Zealand. State Highway 16 and the North Auckland Railway Line pass through it. Kumeū is adjacent to the east, Riverhead is to the north-east, and Waimauku to the west.

History 
The area was historically important to Tāmaki Māori, as it formed a section of Te Tōangaroa, the portage linking the Kaipara Harbour with the Waitematā Harbour via the Kumeū River. The area is a part of the traditional rohe of Ngāti Whātua o Kaipara and Te Kawerau ā Maki, and was traditionally known as Tūrakiawatea.

During early European settlement, the area was an important transport corridor between the Kaipara Harbour and Waitematā Harbour. In 1875, the Kumeu–Riverhead Section of railway was opened. In July 1881, the North Auckland Line linking Auckland to Helensville opened, causing significant growth in the Kumeū area. Huapai grew as a community from 1915 onwards, when it was promoted as an area well suited for fruit growing. The name Huapai was coined during the 1910s, and means "good fruit" in Māori.

The locality is part of the Kumeū wine growing district, with grapes first planted at Huapai by Nikola Nobilo in 1943.

Governance 
Huapai is part of the Local Government Rodney Ward of Auckland Council and is part of the Kumeū Subdivision of the Rodney Local Board.

Huapai is in the Helensville Electorate however proposed Boundary changes in late 2019 could change this. The Local MP's electorate office is based in Huapai.

Huapai School
Huapai District School is a coeducational full primary school (years 1–8), with a decile rating of 9 and a roll of 436 in 2013. Huapai School currently hosts 22 classrooms and has a roll of  students as of  The school has one large and one medium-sized field, with association football and rugby goals respectively, and two playgrounds, with another soon-to-be built adventure playground worth over NZ$50,000. There is a sealed bike track covering the whole school, as well as a BMX track for students. The school also has a tennis / hockey court, swimming pool, flag court, dedicated music suite, professional audio system, and a soon-to-be built completely new administration block including a large library.

References

External links
Huapai District School

Rodney Local Board Area
Populated places in the Auckland Region
West Auckland, New Zealand